The 1983 NCAA Division II men's basketball tournament involved 32 schools playing in a single-elimination tournament to determine the national champion of men's NCAA Division II college basketball as a culmination of the 1982–83 NCAA Division II men's basketball season. It was won by Wright State University and Wright State's Gary Monroe was the Most Outstanding Player.

Regional participants

*denotes tie

Regionals

South Atlantic - Washington, DC 
Location: Physical Activities Center Host: University of the District of Columbia

Third Place - Hampton 71, Randolph-Macon 51

New England - New Britain, Connecticut 
Location: Kaiser Hall Host: Central Connecticut State University

Third Place - Assumption 99, Central Connecticut 89*

North Central - Sioux City, Iowa 
Location: Allee Gym Host: Morningside College

Third Place - Ferris State 81, Nebraska-Omaha 75

South - Carrollton, Georgia 
Location: Health and Physical Education Building Host: University of West Georgia

Third Place - Florida Southern 72, West Chester 71

South Central - Cape Girardeau, Missouri 
Location: Houck Field House Host: Southeast Missouri State University

Third Place - Stephen F. Austin 83, Tennessee–Martin 70

West - Bakersfield, California 
Location: unknown Host: California State University, Bakersfield

Third Place - San Francisco State 78, Humboldt State 71

Great Lakes - Owensboro, Kentucky 
Location: Owensboro Sportscenter Host: Kentucky Wesleyan College

Third Place - Lewis 91, Southern Connecticut 73

East - Bloomsburg, Pennsylvania 
Location: Nelson Field House Host: Bloomsburg State College

Third Place - C. W. Post 83, Cheyney 69

*denotes each overtime played

National Quarterfinals

National Finals - Springfield, Massachusetts 
Location: Springfield Civic Center Hosts: American International College and Springfield College

*denotes each overtime played

All-tournament team
 Anthony Bias (Wright State)
 Michael Britt (District of Columbia)
 Earl Jones (District of Columbia)
 Gary Monroe (Wright State)
 Fred Moore (Wright State)

See also
1983 NCAA Division I men's basketball tournament
1983 NCAA Division II women's basketball tournament
1983 NCAA Division III men's basketball tournament
1983 NAIA Basketball Tournament

References

Sources
 2010 NCAA Men's Basketball Championship Tournament Records and Statistics: Division II men's basketball Championship
 1983 NCAA Division II men's basketball tournament jonfmorse.com

NCAA Division II men's basketball tournament
Tournament
NCAA Division II basketball tournament
NCAA Division II basketball tournament